Futbol Club Barcelona is a Spanish professional football club based in Barcelona. The club first participated in a European competition in 1910, and from 1955 onwards spent every season in one or more European competitions. The first international cup they took part in was the Pyrenees Cup. The competition lasted from 1910 to 1914 and Barcelona won four out of five editions. From 1914 to the beginning of the Latin Cup in 1949, Barcelona did not participate in any international competitions. From the 1955–56 season onward, with the exception of 1956–57 (during the first Fairs Cup, because a Vienna XI withdrew from the competition), they are the only team to have played in the European competitions every year to date.

Barcelona has won the now defunct Cup Winners' Cup four times and Inter-Cities Fairs Cup three times, both tournament records. They also took part in the Latin Cup twice as champions of Spain, winning on both occasions, a record shared with Real Madrid and Milan. Though they did not manage to win the premier European Cup, now the UEFA Champions League, during the early decades of the competition, they have since won the trophy five times, with their first triumph in 1992.

Barcelona is second in the ranking of Europe's most successful clubs in terms of number of official international trophies won, behind Real Madrid. With the 2015 UEFA Super Cup victory in Tbilisi against Sevilla and the 2015 FIFA Club World Cup victory in Yokohama against River Plate, the Catalans raised their trophy haul to 22 international titles, the second largest output behind Real Madrid's 32. In the tables, "(H)" denotes home ground, "(A)" denotes away ground and "(N)" symbolises neutral ground. The first score is always Barcelona's.

Overall record 
 Legend: GF = Goals For. GA = Goals Against. GD = Goal Difference.
Barcelona has won 22 international trophies, placing it third in the all time ranking after Real Madrid (32) and Al-Ahly (24).

Pyrenees Cup 

Barcelona began to play friendly games against teams from the neighbouring regions in France in 1904. Club president Arthur Witty organised the club's first trip abroad, which resulted in their first game against a non-Spanish team. On 1 May 1904, Barcelona defeated the French team Stade Olympien des Étudiants Toulousains.

By 1910, the international friendlies evolved into the Pyrenees Cup, a competition featuring teams from Languedoc, Le Midi, Aquitaine, Catalonia, and the Basque Country. At that time it was considered the finest competition open for participation. Five editions were played in total, with FC Barcelona winning four consecutive trophies from 1910 to 1913.

Latin Cup 
In 1949, the football federations of Spain, Italy, France, and Portugal, came together and launched their own club competition, the Latin Cup, which was staged at the end of every season in a single host country. The competition featured two semi-finals, a third place play-off and a final. As La Liga champions in 1949, Barça represented Spain in the inaugural competition. They beat Reims 5–0 in their semi-final at Les Corts, before beating Sporting Lisbon 2–1 in the final at the Estadio Chamartín. Barça also played in and won the 1952 competition in Paris, beating Juventus 4–2 in the semi-final and then Nice 1–0 in the final. After the introduction of the European Cup, the Latin Cup was gradually discontinued and nowadays, while it is not considered an official tournament by UEFA, it is recognized by FIFA.

European Cup / Champions League 

The European Cup was inaugurated in 1955, with Barcelona's arch-rivals Real Madrid winning the first five editions. In 1959, Barcelona entered this competition for the first time, after winning the 1958–59 La Liga season. Until the 1990s, the club had little success, apart from their runner-up places in 1961 and 1986. In 1992, Johan Cruyff's Dream Team won their first European Cup with a 1–0 win against Sampdoria. Since then, Barcelona has won the competition four additional times, in 2006, 2009, 2011 and 2015. Barcelona has established itself as one of the strongest sides in European competition, when measured in UEFA coefficients.

Cup Winners' Cup 

The Cup Winners' Cup started in 1960, but it took three years until Barcelona participated for the first time. In their first edition, they were eliminated in the first round by Hamburg SV. In 1969, Barcelona's second participation, they advanced to the final, but were beaten by Czechoslovakian side Slovan Bratislava. The first success came in 1979 when Barça defeated Fortuna Düsseldorf in the final 4–3 after extra time. This maiden success was emulated in 1982, 1989, and in their last participation in 1997, after another runner-up place in 1991, before the cup was re-organised into the UEFA Cup in 1999–2000. Barcelona's four victories are the competition's record.

Inter-Cities Fairs Cup 

The Inter-Cities Fairs Cup was established on 18 April 1955, two weeks after the European Cup, to promote trade fairs by playing various cities against each other. However, the city of Barcelona participated with a squad composed entirely of Barcelona players. From 1958 onwards, the organisers reverted to club participation, but the teams still had to come from cities staging trade fairs. Barcelona would go on to win the Fairs Cup a record three times, with also a runner-up place, before the tournament was subsumed into the UEFA Cup in 1971.

The Inter-Cities Fairs Cup is considered to be the forerunner of the UEFA Cup / Europa League, but it is not recognized as a UEFA competition. Consequently, Fairs Cup wins do not count toward the tally of Europa League wins.

UEFA Cup / Europa League 

In the UEFA Cup, Barcelona has lost four semi-finals, in 1975–76, 1977–78, 1995–96 and 2000–01. They lost twice to Liverpool (in 1976 and 2001), once to PSV Eindhoven (in 1978) and once to Bayern Munich (in 1996). In all four cases, the team that had eliminated Barcelona ultimately won the competition. Barcelona participated in the re-branded Europa League for the first time in 2022, going out at the hands of ultimate winners Eintracht Frankfurt in the quarter-finals.

Super Cup 
The Super Cup was inaugurated in 1973 as a way of determining the best team in Europe, by pitting the holders of the first-tier European Cup against the winners of the second-tier Cup Winners' Cup. Barcelona first participated in the 1979 edition, after they won the 1978–79 Cup Winners' Cup. They lost 1–2 on aggregate to Nottingham Forest, having drawn 1–1 in Camp Nou after losing 0–1 at the City Ground in Nottingham. The first victory came in the 1992 edition, when Barça defeated Werder Bremen 3–2 on aggregate. Since then, Barcelona has won the competition four additional times (in 1997, 2009, 2011 and 2015) and now shares the record for victories in the competition (five) with Milan and Real Madrid.

Intercontinental Cup / Club World Cup 
In 1960, UEFA and their South-American equivalent, the South American Football Confederation (CONMEBOL), created the Intercontinental Cup as a way of determining the best team in the world, by pitting the winners of the European Cup and the South American Copa Libertadores against each other. Barcelona have made only one appearance in the Intercontinental Cup, losing 2–1 against São Paulo in December 1992. In 2000, FIFA launched their international club competition called the FIFA Club World Cup, featuring teams from all of its member associations. In the second edition of the Club World Cup, in 2005, FIFA took over the Intercontinental Cup, subsuming it into its own competition. Barcelona has won the FIFA Club World Cup three times (in 2009, 2011 and 2015) and was runner-up once (in 2006).

Notes 
A.  Won on the away goals rule.
B.  Lost on the away goals rule.
C.  Lost on coin toss after play-off.
D.  Won 5–4 on penalties.
E.  Lost 0–2 on penalties.
F.  Won 3–1 on penalties.
G.  Lost play-off 2–3 in Lausanne.
H.  Won play-off 5–0 in Barcelona.
I.  Won on coin toss after play-off.
J.  Won play-off 2–1 in Basel.
K.  Lost play-off 0–1 in Nice.
L.  Vienna XI withdrew from the competition.
M.  Won play-off 3–2.
N.  After the 1970–71 season, the Inter-Cities Fairs Cup was taken over by UEFA. A match was played between Barcelona, the first and record Fairs Cup winners, and Leeds United, the last winners, to decide who should keep the old Fairs Cup trophy permanently.
O.  Won play-off 1–0 in Brussels.

References 
In the UEFA references, access to the specific rounds is achievable by the adjacent table.

Europe
Barcelona